The following is a list of transfers for the 2012 USL Pro season. The transactions begin at the conclusion of the 2011 USL Pro season and end after the championship match of the 2012 season.

Transfers

References

External links 
https://web.archive.org/web/20110515060628/http://uslpro.uslsoccer.com/

Trans
2012
USL Pro